The Thesis of Pulacayo (Tesis de Pulacayo) was an important document in the Bolivian and Latin American labor movement. It was adopted at the request of the delegation of Llallaguaga in the Congreso de la Federación Sindical de Trabajadores Mineros de Bolivia (FSTMB), which met in November 1946 in the city of Pulacayo. The thesis is based on the Trotskyist conception of permanent revolution and on the Transitional Program of the Fourth International.

External links 
Text of the Thesis of Pulacayo

Social history of Bolivia
Trotskyism